Artifodina siamensis is a moth of the family Gracillariidae. It is known from Thailand.

The food plant is unknown, but is probably very closely related to Myrsine semiserata.

References

Gracillariinae
Moths described in 1995